Vokovice is a district of Prague city, part of Prague 6.

It has been a part of Prague since 1922 and as of 2006, 11,197 people live there.

Part of this district is Šárecké údolí, a natural valley, part of which was declared in 1964 as protected territory in Prague. Part of the valley is a pond called Džbán, with a swimming pool and a nearby camp.

Interesting buildings include the tram depot named Vozovna Vokovice, which is sometimes opened to public.

Districts of Prague